A - B - C - D - E - F - G - H - I - J - K - L - M - N - O - P - Q - R - S - T - U - V - W - XYZ

This is a list of rivers in the United States that have names starting with the letter O.  For the main page, which includes links to listings by state, see List of rivers in the United States.

Oa - Oc 
Oak Grove Fork Clackamas River - Oregon
Oak Orchard River - New York
Oatka Creek - New York
Obed River - Tennessee
Obey River - Tennessee
Obion River - Tennessee
Occoquan River - Virginia
Ocheyedan River - Iowa, Minnesota
Ochlockonee River - Georgia, Florida
Ocklawaha River - Florida
Ocmulgee River - Georgia
Ocoee River - Tennessee
Oconee River - Georgia
Oconomowoc River - Wisconsin
Oconto River - Wisconsin
Octoraro Creek - Pennsylvania, Maryland

Og - Om 
Ogden River - Utah
Ogeechee River - Georgia
Ohio Brush Creek - Ohio
Ohio River - Pennsylvania, Ohio, West Virginia, Kentucky, Indiana, Illinois
Ohoopee River - Georgia
Oil Creek - New York, Pennsylvania
Okanogan River - Washington
Old River - Louisiana
Old River - New Hampshire
Olentangy River - Ohio
Oleta River - Florida
Ompompanoosuc River - Vermont

On - Os 
One Hundred and Two River - Iowa, Missouri
Oneida River - New York
Onion River - Wisconsin (tributary of Lake Superior)
Onion River - Wisconsin (tributary of Sheboygan River)
Ontonagon River - Michigan
Oolenoy River - South Carolina
Oostanaula River - Georgia
Opequon Creek - Virginia, West Virginia
Oriskany Creek - New York
Osage River - Missouri
Ossipee River - New Hampshire, Maine
Oswegatchie River - New York
Oswego River - New Jersey
Oswego River - New York

Ot - Oy 
Otay River - California
Otselic River - New York
Ottauquechee River - Vermont
Ottawa River - Ohio (tributary of Auglaize River)
Ottawa River - Ohio, Michigan (tributary of Lake Erie)
Otter Creek - Vermont
Otter Tail River - Minnesota
Ouachita River - Arkansas, Louisiana
Ounce River - Wisconsin
Owens River - California
Owyhee River - Nevada, Idaho, Oregon
Oyster River - Connecticut
Oyster River - New Hampshire
Oyster Pond River - Massachusetts

O